Weston is a town situated  inland from Oamaru, South Island, New Zealand. It is regarded as one of the more affluent towns of the Waitaki District and had a population of 1,050 in the 2018 census.

The town is serviced by a local fire station staffed by volunteers, Four Square chain supermarket, Weston Community Church and the local Weston co-educational primary school.

As with the surrounding areas in North Otago, agriculture is an important economic activity.

Limestone and cement
Weston is home to the largest Oamaru stone quarry in New Zealand, supplying New Zealand and exporting much overseas. The quarry lies a further mile inland from Weston along the Weston/Ngapara Road, so its daily operation is not noticed by Weston residents.

International cement manufacturer Holcim has gained consent to open a cement plant near Weston, involving further limestone quarrying. The application prompted the founding of the Waiareka Preservation Society, which opposes the planned plant. Society members are worried how potential extra traffic through the township would impact on roading infrastructure. However, Holcim has stated a preference for rail transport between the cement works and harbour and would seek to reopen the line to Weston.

The Weston operations were formerly operated by Taylor's Limeworks, a subsidiary of Holcim. 
Taylor's Limeworks consolidated their operations at Makareao (Dunback) in 1990 with the opening of a new plant there. The limeworks at Weston were then sold to Parkside Quarries Ltd, who continue to mine lime and Oamaru stone at two sites. If the Weston Cement Works development goes ahead, new lime/tuff quarries will be established at the western edge of Parkside's operations. The cement works will be on land immediately west of the old Taylor's works at Cormacks.

Demographics 

Weston had a population of 1,050 at the 2018 New Zealand census, an increase of 66 people (6.7%) since the 2013 census, and an increase of 153 people (17.1%) since the 2006 census. There were 411 households. There were 534 males and 516 females, giving a sex ratio of 1.03 males per female. The median age was 46.0 years (compared with 37.4 years nationally), with 210 people (20.0%) aged under 15 years, 144 (13.7%) aged 15 to 29, 474 (45.1%) aged 30 to 64, and 225 (21.4%) aged 65 or older.

Ethnicities were 95.4% European/Pākehā, 6.9% Māori, 0.6% Pacific peoples, 2.3% Asian, and 1.4% other ethnicities (totals add to more than 100% since people could identify with multiple ethnicities).

The proportion of people born overseas was 8.0%, compared with 27.1% nationally.

Although some people objected to giving their religion, 52.0% had no religion, 37.1% were Christian, 0.3% were Buddhist and 2.0% had other religions.

Of those at least 15 years old, 93 (11.1%) people had a bachelor or higher degree, and 201 (23.9%) people had no formal qualifications. The median income was $34,900, compared with $31,800 nationally. 123 people (14.6%) earned over $70,000 compared to 17.2% nationally. The employment status of those at least 15 was that 423 (50.4%) people were employed full-time, 147 (17.5%) were part-time, and 15 (1.8%) were unemployed.

Leisure and recreation 
Weston has some of the largest sporting grounds in the Oamaru region, with the Weston Domain having a full size cricket oval, tennis courts, football, and two rugby union fields, accompanied by a large pavilion and public park/recreation area, and is the home to the Valley Sports Club.

Rockvale Venue Room & Gardens serve the area as a function and wedding venue hire with accommodations in quiet rural surroundings with large formal gardens.

Transport 
Weston is connected to State Highway 1 south via Whiterocks Road and to State Highway 83 via  Airedale and Horse Gully Road.

Ngapara Branch railway 
Weston was the first stop on the defunct Ngapara Branch railway. Built in 1871 to open up the 64300 hectares (159,000 acres) After closure of the branch in July 1959, the first five km remained as Taylor's Siding, serving Taylor's Limeworks and being renamed "the Waiareka Industrial Line", the line closed in 1997 and the rails were uplifted due to low traffic and deteriorating of the track and sleepers. In August 2006, a proposal was made to re-open the first 4.5 km of the branch through Weston. If the proposed cement works eventuates, either the harbour at Timaru or Port Chalmers would be used for shipping purposes. The rail corridor is still owned by ONTRACK and the proposal would involve the operation of at least two trains each way daily.

The surviving portion of the land rail corridor between Waiareka Junction and Parkside Quarries currently forms part of the Alps to Ocean Cycle Trail linking Weston to Oamaru.

Education

References 

Waitaki District
Populated places in Otago